Speedway Park  was a  dirt, oval, auto racing track, located in Jacksonville, Florida.

It was built in 1946 by Eddie Bland on land belonging to the family farm and later came to be known as Jacksonville Speedway after it was sold in 1954.

Opened in 1947, the track was located at the intersection of Lenox Avenue and Plymouth Street in southwest Jacksonville. NASCAR Grand National Series races were held at the track during the 1951, 1952, 1954, 1955, 1961 and 1964 seasons. The final Grand National Series race at the track was won by Wendell Scott, the first African-American to win in NASCAR's top series.

In addition to auto racing, the track hosted the Duval County Exposition. The NASCAR Grand American Series also competed there. After a final NASCAR Grand National East Series race in 1972 won by David Pearson, the track was closed in 1973; a housing development now stands at the site.

Race results

References

Motorsport venues in Florida
NASCAR tracks
Sports venues in Jacksonville, Florida
Defunct motorsport venues in the United States
1947 establishments in Florida
Buildings and structures demolished in 1973
Event venues established in 1947
1973 disestablishments in Florida